is a Japanese former association football player and manager.

Club career
Jinno was born in Soka on June 1, 1970. He was educated at and played for Shutoku High School. After graduating in 1989, he joined Japan Soccer League side Nissan Motors. When Japan's first-ever professional league J1 League started in 1993, Nissan Motors was transformed to Yokohama Marinos for whom he continued to play.

He moved to Japan Football League side Vissel Kobe in 1996 and helped them to gain the promotion to J1 League. In 1999, he was transferred to J2 League side Oita Trinita where he scored the most goals in the league for the season. He played the 2000 season for FC Tokyo. He briefly played for Oita again in the early stage of the 2001 season before he moved to Yokohama FC where he retired from the game in 2003.

National team career
Jinno was a member of the Japan national team that won the 1992 Asian Cup but he was never capped.

Coaching career
Jinno remained at Yokohama FC after the retirement and has been working in the area of development for the club until 2009. After 2011, he worked for Gainare Tottori (2011), Avispa Fukuoka (2012–14) and AC Nagano Parceiro (2015–16). In June 2017, he signed with L.League club NHK Spring Yokohama FC Seagulls and became a manager.

Club statistics

Team honors

Club 
 Asian Cup Winners Cup – 1992
 Japan Soccer League Division 1/J1 League – 1990, 1995
 Emperor's Cup – 1989, 1991, 1992
 JSL Cup – 1989, 1990

National team 
 AFC Asian Cup – 1992

Personal honors 
 J2 League Top Scorer – 1999

References

External links

1970 births
Living people
Association football people from Saitama Prefecture
Japanese footballers
Japan Soccer League players
J1 League players
J2 League players
Japan Football League (1992–1998) players
Yokohama F. Marinos players
Vissel Kobe players
Oita Trinita players
FC Tokyo players
Yokohama FC players
1992 AFC Asian Cup players
AFC Asian Cup-winning players
Japanese football managers
Association football forwards